Ethan Allen Army Airfield is a former United States Army airfield at Fort Ethan Allen, Vermont. It was used for observation aircraft between World War I and World War II.

History
Army observation planes began using a field at Fort Ethan Allen in the early 1920s.  It was used primarily for artillery spotting by the 7th Field Artillery Regiment during training exercises.  The Army used new Consolidated PT-1 trainers, and probably World War I Curtiss JN-4 and JN-6 Jennys for artillery spotting activities.

In 1927, a flood hit the Burlington, Vermont area and the aircraft at the field were used to search for missing people lost in the area and for aerial reconnaissance of the flooded areas, as the areas affected had flooded roads leading to them.

The airfield was closed by the Army about 1940 along with the gradual inactivation of Fort Ethan Allen.  The airfield returned to its original use as a drill field for Vermont National Guardsmen who used the Fort after World War II prior to its transfer to the United States Air Force in 1947 and its subsequent sale to the University of Vermont in 1964.

The Air Force used Fort Ethan Allen primarily for personnel housing and base station facilities supporting Ethan Allen Air Force Base which was co-located with Burlington Airport.   Vermont Army National Guard troops trained at the Fort and the old grass airfield is used occasionally by Army Aviation in the form of Army National Guard helicopters.

References

 Ethan Allen Army Airfield

Buildings and structures in Colchester, Vermont
Buildings and structures in Essex, Vermont
Transportation buildings and structures in Chittenden County, Vermont
Defunct airports in the United States
Airports in Vermont
Airfields of the United States Army Air Forces in Vermont
Military installations in Vermont